Cog Hill Golf & Country Club is a public golf course and country club located  southwest of Chicago, in Lemont. Cog Hill hosted the PGA Tour's BMW Championship from 2009 to 2011 on its championship course Dubsdread, as well as 16 times when the tournament was known as the Western Open.

History
Three brothers moved to the Chicago area in 1920. John W., Martin J., and Bert Coghill bought the McLaughlin farm on the west side of Palos Park, Illinois in 1926 to build a golf club. They then hired David McIntosh, who owned Oak Hills, to build them a golf course. Cog Hill Course #1 opened on the Fourth of July weekend in 1927. Reservations for golf were taken at Chicago's Boston Store, which, at that time, was one of the downtown Chicago's leading department stores. The Chicago and Joliet Electric Railway ran from Chicago to Lemont, giving golfers easy access for 25 cents.

The club expanded in 1929 when the three brothers bought another  from the Reed family on the east side of Parker Road. Course #2 was designed and built by David McIntosh and Bert Coghill. It was opened in the fall of 1929, within days of the Wall Street Crash of 1929. Even during the tough twelve years of the Great Depression, Cog Hill was able to prosper. In 1951, Joe Jemsek bought Cog Hill. Course #3 was added in 1963 and Dubsdread was completed in 1964.

The Western Golf Association awarded the Western Open to Cog Hill in 1991. It changed its name to the BMW Championship in 2007. Tiger Woods shot a course record 9-under 62 on Dubsdread in 2009. Woods has won the tournament at Cog Hill five times.

Tournaments
Major championships held at Cog Hill's Dubsdread course.

BMW Championship

Western Open

U.S. Amateur Championship

U.S. Men's Amateur Public Links

U.S. Women's Amateur Public Links

Courses

Course #1 Blue
Course #1 is the oldest course at Cog Hill. The Blue course was designed and built in 1927.

Course #2 Ravines
Course #2 Ravines was designed and built in 1929. Ravines was adjusted for to host the 1997 United States Amateur Championship. Golf Digest rated the course 4-Stars and as one of "America's 100 Best Courses for $100 or Less".

Course #3 Red
In 1963 Cog Hill added Course #3.

Course #4 Dubsdread
Dubsdread was designed and built by Joseph L. Lee/Dick Wilson in 1964. It was renovated by Rees Jones in 2007–2008.

Notes

References
Chicago's Must-Play Golf Courses
Golflink.com

External links

Golf clubs and courses in Illinois
Sports venues in Cook County, Illinois
UIC Flames
Lemont, Illinois